Administrative divisions of Cambodia have several levels. Cambodia is divided into 24 provinces (Khaet) and the special administrative unit Phnom Penh. Though a different administrative unit, Phnom Penh is at province level, so de facto Cambodia has 25 provinces and municipalities.

Each province is divided into districts (Srok/Khan) -  there are 159 districts throughout the country’s provinces, and 12 are in Phnom Penh. Each province has one capital district (changed to "city/town", krong;), e.g. for Siem Reap, it's Srok Siem Reap. The exceptions are the provinces of Banteay Meanchey, Kandal, Mondulkiri, Oddar Meanchey, Preah Vihear and Ratanakiri, where the province and the capital district does not match.

A district of a province, which is called Srok, is divided into "communes" (khum). A commune is further divided into "villages".

In Phnom Penh the districts are called khan, and their subdivisions sangkat which are smaller in the other provinces.

Sangkat are further subdivided into phum, which are usually translated as villages, though they do not necessarily cover one single settlement.

Administrative units 
Officially, Cambodia is divided into 5 administrative tiers, with different types of administrative unit on each tier:

Local administration
In addition to these subdivisions, there are also cities and towns, which take over some of the responsibilities of the districts and communes on the area covered by the municipality. These all have an elected board and an elected mayor.

There are three different levels of municipalities:
 krong (city): More than 50,000 citizens
 krong (town): More than 10,000 citizens - or a provincial capital

In addition to the population numbers, the municipalities need to have enough tax revenues for the administration to be able to execute the offices of administrations.

Towns and cities are divided into sangkat (communes), which are equivalent to khum of rural areas.

For areas which do not reach the mandatory conditions, they exist another lower level of local administration. These usually cover a complete subdistrict (Khum), but may also cover more than one subdistrict or share a subdistrict with a municipality.

Informal subdivisions
Kandal Province is informally included as part of Phnom Penh, as the urban sprawl of the capital has already spread into these areas.

There are several definitions of regions in Cambodia.

Cambodia Town, Long Beach, California, is sometimes jokingly referred to as the "25th province" of Cambodia, because of the high population of Cambodian Americans that live there.

See also

List of districts in Cambodia
Communes of Cambodia
Provinces of Cambodia
List of cities in Cambodia
ISO 3166-2:KH

References

External links
 Statoid site

 
Cambodia